is a  volcano in Beppu, Ōita, Japan.

Outline 
Mount Tsurumi is a lava dome. It has several peaks, including, Mount Kuranoto, Mount Uchi, Mount Garan. This mountain is one of Japan 300 mountains, and a part of Aso Kujū National Park.

Route 

The easiest way to reach to the top of Mount Tsurumi is to use Kintetsu Beppu Ropeway. When walking up to the top, it takes about two hours from Toriimae Bus Stop and two and half hours from Higashi Tozanguchi Bus Stop.

Access 
 Tsurumi Sanjo Station
 Toriimae Bus Stop
 Higashi Tozanguchi Bus Stop

Gallery

See also
List of volcanoes in Japan

External links 

 Tsurumidake and Garandake: National catalogue of the active volcanoes in Japan - Japan Meteorological Agency
 Tsurumi Dake - Geological Survey of Japan
 

Holocene lava domes
Mountains of Ōita Prefecture
Volcanoes of Kyushu
Volcanoes of Ōita Prefecture